Somos ("We Are") is a democratic socialist and feminist political party in Argentina. It was founded by Victoria Donda in October 2018.

References

2018 establishments in Argentina
Political parties established in 2018
Progressive parties
Socialist parties in Argentina
Feminist parties